Carmelopodus is an ichnogenus of dinosaur footprint. They are suggested to belong to basal ceratosaurs, due to their similarities with abelisaurid footprints. Another footprint from the Middle Jurassic of the USA that belongs to Carmelopodus untermannorum, the type species, has a size of 4 cm (0.13 ft)  and was made by an individual that was 68 cm (2.2 ft) in length and 1 kg (2.2 lbs).

See also

 List of dinosaur ichnogenera

References

Dinosaur trace fossils
Theropods